Woodruff Harlan “Doc” Bruder (February 5, 1901 – November 13, 1952) was a professional football player for the Buffalo Bisons in 1925 and the Frankford Yellow Jackets in 1926. He played college football at Pitt and West Virginia. Bruder won the 1926 NFL championship with the Yellow Jackets.

External links 
 

1901 births
1952 deaths
Players of American football from Houston
Frankford Yellow Jackets players
Buffalo Bisons (NFL) players
Pittsburgh Panthers football players
West Virginia Mountaineers football players
Burials in Texas